The 'Battle of Cruden Bay occurred in the summer of 1012 in the North East of Scotland between Malcolm II and King Canute. Traditionally. the village of Cruden Bay's name was derived from the Gaelic Croch Dain (Slaughter of Danes).

The 1000th anniversary of the battle was marked in 2012.

References

Cruden Bay
11th century in Scotland
Cruden Bay